Daniel Teklehaimanot Girmazion (born 10 November 1988) is a professional road racing cyclist from Eritrea, who last rode for UCI Professional Continental team .

Career
Teklehaimanot was a member of the UCI's World Cycling Centre training program before signing for the new Australian cycling team  in 2012. Whilst at the World Cycling Centre he was diagnosed with tachycardia, which was corrected by surgery in early 2009. He returned to riding in May of that year and went on to finish sixth overall in that year's Tour de l'Avenir. The same year, he won the African Championships in the road race, individual time trial and team time trial, at both senior and under-23 levels. On the 2010–11 UCI Africa Tour, he won the Tour du Rwanda and the Kwita Izina Cycling Tour.

He participated in the 2012 Summer Olympics being the first Eritrean competing in a sport other than athletics; he finished the road race in the 73rd position. In 2012, he became the first Eritrean to ride in the Vuelta a España, one of the 3 grand tours; he finished the race 146th overall.

MTN–Qhubeka (2014–17)
Teklehaimanot joined  for the 2014 season, on a two-year contract. In 2015, at the Critérium du Dauphiné, he won the first World Tour jersey in 's history by taking the mountains competition. He was named in the start list for the 2015 Tour de France. In July of the year, Teklehaimanot also became the first rider from an African team to wear the polka dot jersey at the Tour de France. In 2016, he again won the mountains classification at the Critérium du Dauphiné.

He was named in the start list for the 2017 Giro d'Italia where he briefly held the Mountains Classification jersey. His final race with Dimension Data was the 2017 Tour of Guangxi.

Major results

2007
 8th Road race, All-Africa Games
 9th Road race, African Road Championships
2008
 1st  Road race, National Road Championships
 African Road Championships
5th Time trial
8th Road race
 5th Overall Tour Ivoirien de la Paix
2009
 2nd Overall Tour of Eritrea
1st Stages 1 & 3
 6th Overall Tour de l'Avenir
2010
 African Road Championships
1st  Road race
1st  Time trial
1st  Team time trial
 1st  Overall Tour du Rwanda
1st Stage 2
 1st Stage 2 Coupe des nations Ville Saguenay
2011
 African Road Championships
1st  Time trial
1st  Team time trial
 National Road Championships
1st  Time trial
2nd Road race
 1st  Overall Kwita Izina Cycling Tour
1st Stages 1, 2 & 3
 1st Stage 5 Tour d'Algérie
 5th Overall La Tropicale Amissa Bongo
1st Stage 4
2012
 African Road Championships
1st  Time trial
1st  Team time trial
 National Road Championships
1st  Road race
1st  Time trial
2013
 African Road Championships
1st  Time trial
1st  Team time trial
 1st Prueba Villafranca de Ordizia
2014
 4th Overall Mzansi Tour
2015
 African Road Championships
1st  Team time trial
2nd  Time trial
 1st  Time trial, National Road Championships
 1st  Mountains classification, Critérium du Dauphiné
 Tour de France
Held  after Stages 6–9
2016
 National Road Championships
1st  Road race
1st  Time trial
 1st  Mountains classification, Critérium du Dauphiné
 3rd  Time trial, African Road Championships
2017
 3rd Time trial, National Road Championships
 7th Overall Tour of Austria
 Giro d'Italia
Held  after Stages 2–3
2018
 1st  Time trial, National Road Championships
2019
 9th Overall La Tropicale Amissa Bongo

Grand Tour general classification results timeline

References

External links

1988 births
Living people
Eritrean male cyclists
Cyclists at the 2012 Summer Olympics
Cyclists at the 2016 Summer Olympics
Olympic cyclists of Eritrea
People from Southern Region (Eritrea)
Competitors at the 2007 All-Africa Games
African Games competitors for Eritrea